Ruta graveolens, commonly known as rue, common rue or herb-of-grace, is a species of Ruta grown as an ornamental plant and herb. It is native to the Balkan Peninsula. It is grown throughout the world in gardens, especially for its bluish leaves, and sometimes for its tolerance of hot and dry soil conditions. It is also cultivated as a culinary herb, and to a lesser extent as an insect repellent and incense.

Etymology
The specific epithet graveolens refers to the strong-smelling leaves.

Description 

Rue is a woody, perennial shrub. Its leaves are oblong, blue green and arranged pinnate; they release a strong aroma when they are bruised.

The flowers are small with 4 to 5 dull yellow petals in clusters. They bear brown seed capsules when pollinated.

Uses

Traditional use 

In the ancient Roman world, the naturalists Pedanius Dioscorides and Pliny the Elder recommended that rue be combined with the poisonous shrub oleander to be drunk as an antidote to venomous snake bites.

The refined oil of rue is an emmenagogue and was cited by the Roman historian Pliny the Elder and Soranus as an abortifacient (inducing abortion).

Culinary use 

Rue has a culinary use, but since it is bitter and gastric discomfort may be experienced by some individuals, it is used sparingly. Although used more extensively in former times, it is not a herb that is typically found in modern cuisine. It is a component of berbere, the characteristic Ethiopian-Eritrean spice mixture, and as such is encountered in their cuisine. Also in Ethiopia, fresh rue is dipped in coffee before drinking it. Due to small amounts of toxins it contains, it must be used in small amounts, and should be avoided by pregnant women or women who have liver issues.

It has a variety of other culinary uses:
 It was used extensively in ancient Near Eastern and Roman cuisine (according to Ibn Sayyar al-Warraq and Apicius).
 Rue is used as a traditional flavouring in Greece and other Mediterranean countries.
 In Istria (a region spanning Croatia and Slovenia), and in Northern Italy, it is used to give a special flavour to grappa/raki and most of the time a little branch of the plant can be found in the bottle. This is called grappa alla ruta.
 Seeds can be used for porridge.
 The bitter leaf can be added to eggs, cheese, fish, or mixed with damson plums and wine to produce a meat sauce.
 In Italy in Friuli Venezia-Giulia, the young branches of the plant are dipped in a batter, deep-fried in oil, and consumed with salt or sugar. They are also used on their own to aromatise a specific type of omelette.
 Used in Old World beers as flavouring ingredient.

Other 
Rue is also grown as an ornamental plant, both as a low hedge and so the leaves can be used in nosegays.

Most cats dislike the smell of it, and it can, therefore, be used as a deterrent to them (see also Plectranthus caninus).

Caterpillars of some subspecies of the butterfly Papilio machaon feed on rue, as well as other plants. The caterpillars of Papilio xuthus also feed readily on it.

Hasidic Jews also were taught that rue should be placed into amulets to protect them from epidemics and plagues. Other Hasidim rely on the works of a famous Baghdadi Kabbalist Yaakov Chaim Sofer who makes mention of the plant "ruda" as an effective device against both black magic and the evil eye.

It finds many household uses around the world as well. It is traditionally used in Central Asia as an insect repellent and room deodorizer.

Toxicity
Rue is generally safe if consumed in small amounts as an herb to flavor food. Rue extracts are mutagenic and hepatotoxic.   Large doses can cause violent gastric pain, vomiting, liver damage, and death. This is due to a variety of toxic compounds in the plant's sap. It is recommended to only use small amounts in food, and to not consume it excessively. It should be strictly avoided by pregnant women, as it can be an abortifacient and teratogen.

Exposure to common rue, or herbal preparations derived from it, can cause severe phytophotodermatitis, which results in burn-like blisters on the skin.

Chemistry 

A series of furanoacridones and two acridone alkaloids (arborinine and evoxanthine) have been isolated from R. graveolens. It also contains coumarins and limonoids.

Cell cultures produce the coumarins umbelliferone, scopoletin, psoralen, xanthotoxin, isopimpinellin, rutamarin and rutacultin, and the alkaloids skimmianine, kokusaginine, 6-methoxydictamnine and edulinine.

The ethyl acetate extract of R. graveolens leaves yields two furanocoumarins, one quinoline alkaloid and four quinolone alkaloids including graveoline.

The chloroform extracts of the root, stem and leaf shows the isolation of the furanocoumarin chalepensin.

The essential oil of R. graveolens contains two main constituents, undecan-2-one (46.8%) and nonan-2-one (18.8%).

Symbolism
The bitter taste of its leaves led to rue being associated with the (etymologically unrelated) verb rue "to regret". Rue is well known for its symbolic meaning of regret and it has sometimes been called "herb-of-grace" in literary works. In mythology, the basilisk, whose breath could cause plants to wilt and stones to crack, had no effect on rue.  Weasels who were bitten by the basilisk would retreat and eat rue in order to recover and return to fight.

In the Bible 
Rue is mentioned in the Bible, Luke 11:42: "But woe unto you, Pharisees! For ye tithe mint and rue and all manner of herbs".

In Lithuania 
Rue is considered a national herb of Lithuania and it is the most frequently referenced herb in Lithuanian folk songs, as an attribute of young girls, associated with virginity and maidenhood. It was common in traditional Lithuanian weddings for only virgins to wear a rue at their wedding, a symbol to show their purity.

In Ukraine 
Likewise, rue is prominent in Ukrainian folklore, songs and culture. In the Ukrainian folk song "Oi poli ruta, ruta" (O, rue, rue in the field), the girl regrets losing her virginity, reproaching the lover for "breaking the green hazel tree". "Chervona Ruta" (Червона Рута—"Red Rue") is a song, written by Volodymyr Ivasyuk, a popular Ukrainian poet and composer. Pop singer Sofia Rotaru performed the song in 1971.

In Jewish culture 
"Una Matica de Ruda" is a traditional Sephardic wedding song.

In English literature 
It is one of the flowers distributed by the mad Ophelia in William Shakespeare's Hamlet (IV.5):

"There's fennel for you, and columbines:
there's rue for you; and here's some for me:
we may call it herb-grace o' Sundays:
O you must wear your rue with a difference..."

It was planted by the gardener in Richard II to mark the spot where the Queen wept upon hearing news of Richard's capture (III.4.104–105):

"Here did she fall a tear, here in this place
I'll set a bank of rue, sour herb of grace."

It is also given by the rusticated Perdita to her disguised royal father-in-law on the occasion of a sheep-shearing (Winter's Tale, IV.4):
"For you there's rosemary and rue; these keep 
Seeming and savour all the winter long."

It is used by Michael in Milton's Paradise Lost to give Adam clear sight (11.414): 
"Then purg'd with euphrasy and rue
The visual nerve, for he had much to see."

Rue is used by Gulliver in Gulliver's Travels (by Jonathan Swift) when he returns to England after living among the "Houyhnhnms". Gulliver can no longer stand the smell of the English Yahoos (people), so he stuffs rue or tobacco in his nose to block out the smell. "I was at last bold enough to walk the street in his (Don Pedro's) company, but kept my nose well with rue, or sometimes with tobacco".

See also
 Peganum harmala, an unrelated plant also known as "Syrian rue"

References

External links

Rue (Ruta graveolens L.) page from Gernot Katzer's Spice Pages

graveolens
Herbs
Medicinal plants
Abortifacients
Plants described in 1753
Taxa named by Carl Linnaeus
Mutagens
Subshrubs
National symbols of Lithuania